Antoine Louis François Sergent, called Sergent-Marceau (1751–1847) was a French painter and printmaker.

He married Emira Marceau, General Marceau's sister, and used the two names together.

1751 births
1847 deaths
Deputies to the French National Convention
French printmakers
Artists from Chartres
Color engravers